Kadina Rahasya (Kannada: ಕಾಡಿನ ರಹಸ್ಯ) is a 1969 Indian Kannada film, directed by Geethapriya and produced by R. Rangappa and M. P. Shankar. The film stars Yashraj, Sudarshan, K. S. Ashwath and Narasimharaju in the lead roles. The film has musical score by Chellapilla Satyam.

Cast

M. P. Shankar
Sudarshan
Shailashree
K. S. Ashwath
Narasimharaju
Dwarakish
Tiger Prabhakar
 Yasraj

References

External links
 

1969 films
1960s Kannada-language films
Films scored by Satyam (composer)
Films directed by Geethapriya